Wusheng Township is a township under the administration of Muchuan County in Sichuan, China. , it has one residential community and 13 villages under its administration.

See also 
 List of township-level divisions of Sichuan

References 

Township-level divisions of Sichuan
Muchuan County